Jay Boekelheide is an American sound editor . He won an Academy Award in 1983 for The Right Stuff in the category of Best Sound Editing.
His brother Todd Boekelheide is also an Oscar winner, who won for best sound.

Selected filmography

Species (1995)
Johnny Mnemonic (1994)
Amadeus (1984)
The Right Stuff (1983)
Dragonslayer (1981)

References

External links

American sound editors
Best Sound Editing Academy Award winners
Living people
Year of birth missing (living people)